Dupont Industries, Inc. or DuponTrolley Industries was a Canadian company specializing in the manufacture and rebuilding of buses. Based in Quebec City, it had been in business for over 60 years.

Most of Dupont's clients were in Canada and the United States.

History
Dupont Industries was founded in 1997 by Jean Dupont, the owner of autobus Dupont (or Dupont Motorcoach), which was founded in 1936 by his grandfather. Dupont Industries, also known as DuponTrolley, built trolley bus replicas (mainly sold to American clients) and performed refurbishment of transit buses (mainly for Canadian clients). Dupont Motorcoach had built a heavy-duty trolley replica which received considerable attention, leading to the spin-off DuponTrolley.

Products

Clients

 Citroussillion
 L'aerobus
 Hamilton Street Railway
 Transport en commun La Québécoise inc
 Transdev Limocar
 Veolia Transport North America

References

External links 
 

Bus manufacturers of Canada
Companies based in Quebec City
Manufacturing companies based in Quebec
Motor vehicle assembly plants in Canada
Motor vehicle manufacturers based in Quebec
Canadian brands